Tetranectin is a protein that in humans is encoded by the CLEC3B gene.

References

External links

Further reading